In linear algebra, the identity matrix of size  is the  square matrix with ones on the main diagonal and zeros elsewhere.

Terminology and notation

The term unit matrix has also been widely used, but the term identity matrix is now standard.  The term unit matrix is ambiguous, because it is also used for a matrix of ones and for any unit of the ring of all  matrices.

In some fields, such as group theory or quantum mechanics, the identity matrix is sometimes denoted by a boldface one, or called "id" (short for identity).

In terms of a notation that is sometimes used to concisely describe diagonal matrices, the identity matrix can be written as

The identity matrix can also be written using the Kronecker delta notation:

Properties
When  is an  matrix, it is a property of matrix multiplication that

In particular, the identity matrix serves as the multiplicative identity of the matrix ring of all  matrices, and as the identity element of the general linear group , which consists of all invertible  matrices under the matrix multiplication operation. In particular, the identity matrix is invertible. It is an involutory matrix, equal to its own inverse. In this group, two square matrices have the identity matrix as their product exactly when they are the inverses of each other.

When  matrices are used to represent linear transformations from an -dimensional vector space to itself, the identity matrix  represents the identity function, for whatever basis was used in this representation.

The th column of an identity matrix is the unit vector , a vector whose th entry is 1 and 0 elsewhere.

The identity matrix is the only idempotent matrix with non-zero determinant. That is, it is the only matrix such that:

 When multiplied by itself, the result is itself
 All of its rows and columns are linearly independent.

The principal square root of an identity matrix is itself, and this is its only positive-definite square root. However, every identity matrix with at least two rows and columns has an infinitude of symmetric square roots.

The rank of an identity matrix  equals the size , i.e.:

See also
 Binary matrix (zero-one matrix)
 Elementary matrix
 Exchange matrix
 Matrix of ones
 Pauli matrices (the identity matrix is the zeroth Pauli matrix)
 Householder transformation (the Householder matrix is built through the identity matrix)
 Square root of a 2 by 2 identity matrix
 Unitary matrix
 Zero matrix

Notes

Matrices
1 (number)
Sparse matrices